FC Košice is a Slovak association football club based in Košice, that currently plays in the 2. Liga, the second tier of Slovak football. FC Košice was founded in 2018. They merged into a new club with FK Košice-Barca.

Previous names
 ŠK Vyšné Opátske (1921)
 TJ Sokol Vyšné Opátske (1948)
 TJ FK Turkon Vyšné Opátske (2006)
 TJ FK Vyšné Opátske (2014)
 FK Košice (2017, new club)
 FC Košice (merger with FK Košice-Barca) (2018–present, new club)

Logos

Affiliated clubs
The following clubs were affiliated with FC Košice:
  West Ham (2018–2019)
  Slávia TU Košice (2020-)
  MŠK Tesla Stropkov (2023-)

Sponsorship

Results

League and domestic cup history
{|class="wikitable"
! style="color:#00509E; background:#FDEE00;"! rowspan="2" |Season
! style="color:#00509E; background:#FDEE00;"! colspan="8" |League
! style="color:#00509E; background:#FDEE00;"! rowspan="2" |Slovak Cup
! style="color:#00509E; background:#FDEE00;"! colspan="2" |Top goalscorer(s)
|- bgcolor="#efefef"
! style="color:#00509E; background:#FDEE00;"| Division (Name)
! style="color:#00509E; background:#FDEE00;" | Pos/T
! style="color:#00509E; background:#FDEE00;"| Pld
! style="color:#00509E; background:#FDEE00;" | W
! style="color:#00509E; background:#FDEE00;"| D
! style="color:#00509E; background:#FDEE00;"| L
! style="color:#00509E; background:#FDEE00;" |Score
! style="color:#00509E; background:#FDEE00;" | Pts
! style="color:#00509E; background:#FDEE00;" | Name(s)
! style="color:#00509E; background:#FDEE00;" |Goals
|-
| align="center" |2018–19
| align="center" |3rd (3. Liga)
| align="center" bgcolor="green" |1/(16)
| align="center" |26
| align="center" |25
| align="center" |0
| align="center" |1
| align="center" |90:9
| align="center" |75
| align="center" |QF, 0–0  (Spartak Trnava)
| Filip Serečin
|26
|-
| align="center" |2019–20
| align="center" |2nd (2. Liga)
| align="center" |10/(16)
| align="center" |17
| align="center" |5
| align="center" |6
| align="center" |6
| align="center" |22:18
| align="center" |21
| align="center" |R4, 2–2  (AS Trenčín)
| Erik Liener
|5
|-
| align="center" |2020–21
| align="center" |2nd (2. Liga)
| align="center" |5/(15)
| align="center" |28
| align="center" |15
| align="center" |4
| align="center" |9
| align="center" |40:27
| align="center" |49
| align="center" |SF, 3-8 agg. (MŠK Žilina)
| František Pavúk / Boris Gáll
|6
|-
| align="center" |2021–22
| align="center" |2nd (2. Liga)
| align="center" |5/(16)
| align="center" |30
| align="center" |17
| align="center" |5
| align="center" |8
| align="center" |73:38
| align="center" |56
| align="center" |Ro16, 1–2 (Spartak Trnava)
| Erik Pačinda
|17
|}

Current squad
As of 15 February 2023.

For recent transfers, see List of Slovak football transfers winter 2022-23

Out on loan 2021–22

Technical staff
Source:

 Last updated: 10 June 2022

Notable players
The following players had international caps for their respective countries. Players whose name is listed in bold represented their countries while playing for FC Košice.

 Marián Kello
 Ján Krivák
 Richard Lásik
 Erik Pačinda

Managers

 Miroslav Sovič (2017 – 2019)
 Gejza Farkaš (Jun 2019 – Aug 2019)
 Marek Fabuľa (Aug 2019 – Oct 2020)
 Peter Šinglár (Oct 2020 – Mar 2021) (interim)
 Jozef Vukušič (Mar 2021 - May 2022)
 Anton Šoltis (May 2022 - current)

External links
Official club website 
Club profile at Futbalnet.sk portal 
Club profile at Ligy.sk portal

References

FC Kosice
Phoenix clubs (association football)
Association football clubs established in 2018
2018 establishments in Slovakia
Sport in Košice